is a Japanese manga series written and illustrated by Jun Sadogawa. It was serialized between May 2002 and February 2006 in Akita Shoten's Weekly Shōnen Champion and was collected in 17 volumes. A continuation titled Muteki Kanban Musume N was serialized in Weekly Shōnen Champion between March 2006 and April 2007 and was collected in five volumes. A 12-episode anime television series adaptation animated by Telecom Animation Film aired in Japan between July and September 2006. The original manga was licensed in North America as Noodle Fighter Miki, and the anime was licensed in North America as Ramen Fighter Miki. The series premiered on Toku in the United States in January 2016.

Plot
Muteki Kanban Musume is a comedy detailing the adventures of Miki Onimaru, a girl who recently turned 20, whose mother runs a Chinese ramen restaurant. Miki works as the delivery girl for the shop but frequently gets into trouble due to her boisterous, active personality. Much of the humor of the series derives from the characters' over-the-top behavior.

Characters

Miki is the new delivery girl for the Onimaru family ramen shop (usually shortened to just Onimaru). Though 20 years old, she still pretty much has the mind and maturity of a 12-year-old child, with a corresponding energy and fiercely competitive personality that makes her stand out. She is often seen to start fights and competitions; her physical strength is admirable and her fighting style is frantic and unpredictable. Violent as she may be, Miki is a caring and kind-hearted girl who is keen to help anyone in need. This sweet-gentleness comes to the forefront when she is drunk, turning her from a crude tomboy to the very portrait of an ideal Japanese lady (or Yamato Nadeshiko).

Megumi is Miki's long-time rival and the delivery girl for the bakery directly across the street from Onimaru. As they attended the same grades in school, one can assume she is also 20. Like Miki, she is committed to being the best, but often falls short to the other girl's antics. Megumi specializes in throwing sharpened bamboo skewers (in the manner of darts); she learned to do this by training with an elementary school teacher who tossed bits of chalk at his students who fell asleep. While Megumi often claims to be ruthlessly bullied by Miki, her own behavior is by no means innocent, and she often sets traps for Onimaru. When push comes to shove, however, she can still be fundamentally kind-hearted like Miki, particularly when it comes to matters of helping children in need. And just as Miki becomes a lady-amongst-ladies when drunk, Megumi becomes the definition of a crude and violent tomboy when in a similar state (or more like a yakuza).

Makiko is much more practical and down-to-earth than Miki. As Miki's mother, she genuinely cares about the girl, but can be quite harsh, and often loses her temper, slapping Miki around. This violence, however, is very unrealistic. It is once shown during a flashback, she was once actually quite beautiful; the stress of raising such an exasperating daughter like Miki was no doubt the cause of her current obesity. As she has Miki deliver ramen, Makiko's mantra is "Deliveries are about speed!" When she is drunk, she turns to be a drunken kung fu master.

Akihiko is the owner of the grocery store next door to Onimaru. He spends a good amount of his free time at the ramen shop, hanging out with Miki's mother. He views his friends' goings-on with bemusement, but he accepts that that's the way she is. Ohta is a huge fan of Super Space Battle Team Star Rangers. He is also a skilled graffiti artist. He often takes some physical punishment at random times. When he was little he was often bullied by his classmates, such as forced to confess to a girl he doesn't like at all.

He has just returned to the town after spending four years at college. He has a considerable grudge against Miki because she used to bully him, despite being younger than him. Kankuro is a case study (however comic) of the effects of abuse: despite being a 24-year-old college graduate, his heart is forever unable to grow up and move on unless he destroys the traumatic past that is Miki. Kankuro is somewhat thickheaded, and often fails to take Miki's resourcefulness into account when he schemes against her. He almost always adds "nya" at the end of his sentences. He is poor and does odd jobs in order to support himself. What adds to Kankuro's hate towards Miki is the fact that Miki can never remember his name.

She is a teacher at the local high school. She is greatly feared by students, because of her creepy appearance and the air of depression around her. She dislikes her job because of the pressure she puts on students even though she cares about their futures. The show makes visual references to Sadako Yamamura when Miki, Akihiko, and Megumi first meet her. Ramen puts Tomoka in another mood and she cheers up and becomes incredibly cute when she eats it. Such is the beauty of her appearance in this state that drop-out delinquents fall in love at first sight, and diligently return to school just to see her adorable smile every day. Megumi doesn't know Tomoka's true identity, and believes she is a vengeful ghost. It is also shown that she can climb up walls like a gekko, causing many people to mistake her for a vengeful ghost. Tomoka is poor as shown in the episode when Megumi first encounters her, she was up on a tree picking peaches for dinner. Also, in one episode you see her room which was really empty and the fact that she traded a plushie for ramen.

He is a vicious dog that lives in town (though fears Makiko), and Miki's strongest non-human opponent. He is very strong as shown when he was able to act as a mount. Miki seems to understand its growls and barks, and thus she says it claims to bite people for the sake of world peace. Later on he becomes friends with Kankuro. He also appears in the every episode's ending titles.

 Toshiyuki's young owner, she is not threatened by the dog, who acts harmless around her.

Super Space Battle Team Star Rangers
 A children's television action show in the world of Muteki Kanban Musume. It is along the lines of Super Sentai. There are five members of the team: Red Star, Pink Star, Yellow Star, Blue Star, and Black Star.

Hell's Bunny
 The Star Rangers' most nefarious and strongest foe. Depicted as an attractive woman in a long dress and partial rabbit costume, she wields a large wooden mallet and displays excellent attack skills.

Pink Star
 A friend of the actress that plays Hell's Bunny. Before meeting Miki, she was not used to using too much force, probably due to a lack of confidence. Her attack, Star Light Knee had the power of a person's poke. Later she gained confidence due to Miki's behavior and began using more strength when using her character's special knee attack.

Media

Manga
Muteki Kanban Musume is a manga series written and illustrated by Jun Sadogawa. It was serialized in Akita Shoten's Weekly Shōnen Champion from the 25th issue of 2002 to the 13th issue of 2006, sold between May 16, 2002, and February 23, 2006. It was collected in 17 tankōbon volumes published between November 14, 2002, and June 8, 2006. The manga was licensed for release in North America by ADV Manga under the title Noodle Fighter Miki. A sequel titled Muteki Kanban Musume N was serialized in Weekly Shōnen Champion from the 16th issue of 2006 to the combined 22nd/23rd issue of 2007, sold between March 16, 2006, and April 26, 2007. It was collected in five tankōbon volumes published between July 7, 2006, and July 6, 2007.

Anime
A 12-episode anime television series adaptation, animated by Telecom Animation Film, directed by Nobuo Tomizawa, and written by Touko Machida aired in Japan between July 4 and September 19, 2006, on Chiba TV. The anime was licensed for release in North America by Anime Works under the title Ramen Fighter Miki. The series premiered on Toku in the United States in January 2016.

Episode list

See also
Cooking Master Boy
Fighting Foodons
Iron Wok Jan
Yakitate!! Japan

References

Further reading

External links
 Anime official website 
 

2002 manga
2006 manga
2006 anime television series debuts
ADV Manga
Akita Shoten manga
Anime Works
Comedy anime and manga
Cooking in anime and manga
Shōnen manga
TMS Entertainment
Yomiuri Telecasting Corporation original programming